The Texas Tech Lady Raiders basketball team represents Texas Tech University and competes in the Big 12 Conference of  NCAA Division I.

History
The 1975–76 season saw the debut of women's basketball at Texas Tech University. In 1993, the team won the NCAA Division I women's basketball tournament.

Home arenas

All six home games were played at the on campus Women's Gym during the Lady Raiders' inaugural 1975–76 season. The following two seasons, the Lady Raiders began playing select home games along the Red Raiders basketball team at Lubbock Municipal Coliseum. By the 1978–79 season, the team no longer split time between the two venues, playing only at Lubbock Municipal Coliseum until the United Supermarkets Arena opened in time for the 1999–2000 season.

Head coaches

Players

Retired jerseys

Year-by-year results

Notes

NCAA tournament results
The Lady Raiders have appeared in 20 NCAA Tournaments, with a record of 30-19.

See also

List of Texas Tech Lady Raiders in the WNBA draft

Notes

References
2009/10 Texas Tech Lady Raiders Media Guide: History

External links